FIRST LEGO Challenge League Open Championships are robotics competitions held and managed by FIRST LEGO League Partners to bring FIRST LEGO League Challenge teams from many states, regions and countries together to compete in host cities around the world. These are the highest level of FIRST LEGO League competitions that are managed by organizations other than FIRST. The FIRST-managed global competition for FIRST LEGO League is the FLL World Festival. There are usually multiple Open Championships each year.

FIRST LEGO League Open European Championship

2006 Eindhoven, Netherlands 
The 2006 FIRST LEGO League Open European Championship was held May 6,7 in Eindhoven, Netherlands. The venue was the Technical University of Eindhoven. 84 teams from 27 countries competed for the Awards in this year's season "Ocean Odyssey".

2007 Bodø, Norway 
The 2007 FIRST LEGO League Open European Championship was held from May 16 to 21 in Bodø, Norway. There were 66 teams from Austria, Canada, China, Czech Republic, Germany, Hungary, Iceland, Israel, Japan, Jordan, Korea, Mexico, Netherlands, Norway, Peru, Poland, Russia, Saudi Arabia, Singapore, South Africa, Spain, Sweden, Taiwan, Turkey, United Kingdom, and United States.

The theme for the competition was Nano Quest to challenge participating teams to research and design new solutions using nanotechnology. It also had a standard FLL tournament for the teams to compete. There were many awards in the competitions including FLL OEC Champion's Award, Research Award, Presentation Award, Robot Design Award, Programmers Award, Innovative Design Award, Robot Performance Award, Coach/Mentor Award, Teamwork Award, Against All Odds Award, and Team Spirit Award.

2009 Copenhagen, Denmark 
The open championship for 2009 was held in Copenhagen, Denmark from May 1 to May 3. The event was called Children's Climate Call with teams answering a call to address the global issue of climate change. The event followed standard the standard FIRST LEGO League championship format with a tournament and presentation. There were many awards in technical, project presentation, and special recognition categories. The highest award was the OEC Champion's Award. Fifty-five teams from 29 countries and states around the world presented their solutions in two groups, Climate Connections and Climate Actions. The participants also enjoyed a visit by His Royal Highness Crown Prince Frederik of Denmark.

2010 Istanbul, Turkey 
The 2010 FIRST LEGO League Open European Championship was held June 2,3 2010 in Istanbul, Turkey. 56 teams competed for the Awards. The venue was the Haliç Congress Center which has a rich historical background. In the old etchings, the area of center can be seen as a slaughterhouse. The building took its recent neoclassic form in the 1920s.

Haliç Congress Center contains four different types of buildings. These buildings are; Cinema Building, Concert Hall, Theatre Building and Exhibition Hall. All of them are equipped with the latest technology. The center is located in the inner area of Haliç (Golden Horn).

2011 Delft, Netherlands
The 2011 FIRST LEGO League Open European Championship was held June 2–4 in Delft, Netherlands. 67 teams competed at the event held at the Delft University of Technology. The competition theme was Body Forward, on the topic of biomedical engineering.

2012 Mannheim, Germany
The FIRST LEGO League Open European Championship took place in Mannheim, Germany, from June 6 to June 9, 2012.
It hosted 67 teams from more than 35 countries. The competition theme was Food Factor, on the topic of food safety.

2013 Paderborn, Germany
The Open European Championship 2013 took place in Paderborn, Germany, from May 7 to May 10, 2013.
It hosted 54 teams from more than 35 countries. The competition theme was Senior Solutions. This year, the teams had to find solutions to help older people in their daily lives, thus improving their life quality.
 FLL OEC 2013 Web
 FLL OEC 2013 Robot Game Scoring
 FLL OEC 2013 Awards
 FLL OEC 2013 Statistical Results

2014 Pamplona, Spain
The Open European Championship 2014 took place in Pamplona, Spain, from May 28 to May 31, 2014.  The event gathered 95 FLL teams, over 1.500 attendees, from 41 countries all over the world.
 FLL OEC 2014 Web
 Press Release
 Final Report
 YouTube Channel
 Blog
 Facebook Group
 Flickr

2016 Tenerife, Spain
The Open European Championship 2016 took place in Tenerife, Spain, from May 4 to May 7, 2016. 89 FIRST LEGO League teams from 40 countries from all over the world competed in the Trash Trek challenge at the OEC. The teams had to find solutions for better recycling, waste management and waste reduction.

FLL OEC 2016 Web

Flickr

2017 Aarhus, Denmark
The 2017 FIRST LEGO League Open European Championship took place in Navitas Research Institute in Aarhus, Denmark from May 25 to 28, 2017. A total of 118 teams from 50 countries from all over the world attended the invitational championship in Aarhus, Denmark.

FIRST LEGO League Asia-Pacific Open Championship

2008 Tokyo, Japan 
The 2008 FIRST LEGO League Open Asian Championship was held from April 27 to 29 in Tokyo, Japan. The event was held at the Tokyo Metropolitan Gymnasium. There were 55 teams from Brazil, Canada, China, Denmark, Egypt, Germany, France, Hong Kong, Ireland, Israel, Japan, Malaysia, Mexico, Netherlands, Norway, Peru, Saudi Arabia, Singapore, South Korea, Spain, Sweden, Taiwan, Turkey, United Kingdom, and United States that joined the competition in the theme of Power Puzzle.

2010 Kaohsiung, Taiwan 
The 2010 First Lego League Open International Championship was held May 6–8, 2010 in Kaohsiung, Taiwan. 64 teams from 24 countries competed for the Awards. The venue was the Kaohsiung Arena. The Kaohsiung Arena is located at the intersection of Bo'ai Road and Sinjhuangzai Road. It extends over a total area of 56,000 square meters. This state-of-the-art and multifunctional sports arena, with a seating capacity of 15,000, is also known to the citizens of Kaohsiung as 'Xiaojudan'.

2013 Sydney, Australia 
The 2013 First Lego League Asia-Pacific Open Championship was held in Macquarie University, Sydney, from the 4th to 6 July 2013. 30 teams came from countries including India, Brazil, China, Japan, South Korea, Philippines, Hong Kong, Singapore, Taiwan, Egypt, Australia and Thailand.

2015 Sydney, Australia 
The 2015 First Lego League Asia-Pacific Open Championship was held at Macquarie University, Sydney, from the 10th to 12 July 2015.
More than 40 teams from around the globe came to participate.

2016 Sydney, Australia
The Asia Pacific Open 2016 took place in Sydney, Australia on the 3-5 of July 2016.

2017 Sydney, Australia
The Asia Pacific Open 2017 took place in Sydney, Australia on the 6–9 July 2017.

FIRST LEGO League North American Open Championship

2009 Dayton, Ohio 
FIRST LEGO League United States Open Championship was held for the first time from May 7 to 9 at Wright State University campus in Dayton, Ohio. It was the first national level competition of FIRST LEGO League in the United States not organized by FIRST. The event was organized by Wright-Patterson Air Force Base and Wright State University. There were 60 teams around the country each of which was the Championship's Award winner of each state/region. Each team completed 9 tasks on a competition table in a 2.5 minute robot round. Teams also meet with judges for evaluation of their robot design, programming and their problem-solving strategies, and their research project, which is tied  to the Challenge theme. There were many award categories with the top three winners receiving Champion's Awards.

2011 Carlsbad, California
The 2011 FIRST LEGO League North American Open Championship was held May 21–22 in Carlsbad, California. 76 teams competed at the event held at LEGOLAND California. The competition theme was Body Forward. The awards given were:

 Champion
 Robot Performance
 Robot Design
 Project
 Core Values
 Judges' Awards

2012 Carlsbad, California & Winter Haven, Florida
The first of two 2012 North American Open Championships was held May 18–20 in Carlsbad, California at LEGOLAND California.  It was joined by its newly opened sister park Legoland Florida in Winter Haven, FL which also hosted a tournament May 4–6.

FIRST LEGO League International Open Championship Canada

2014 Toronto, Canada 
The 2014 FIRST LEGO League International Open Canada was held June 4–7 in Toronto, Ontario, Canada. The venue was the University of Toronto, downtown campus, specifically in Varsity Arena. 72 teams from countries around the world will be competing for robotic supremacy in the "Nature's Fury" theme.  For more information on the event, please visit http://fllinternationalopen.org/canada/.

FIRST LEGO League Open Africa Championship

2015 Johannesburg, South Africa 
The 2015 FIRST Lego League Open Africa Championship was held in Johannesburg, South Africa, from the 5th to 7 May 2015.

FIRST LEGO League Razorback Invitational Championship

2015 Fayetteville, Arkansas 
The 2015 FIRST LEGO League Razorback Invitational was a 72-team, invitational, FIRST LEGO League championship tournament held May 14–17, 2015, on the University of Arkansas campus in Fayetteville, Arkansas. The event was hosted by the Freshman Engineering Program at the University of Arkansas.

2016 Fayetteville, Arkansas 
The 2016 Razorback Invitational was held in Fayetteville, Arkansas from May 19–22, 2016.

2017 Fayetteville, Arkansas 
The 2017 Razorback Invitational was held in Fayetteville, Arkansas from May 18–21, 2017.

FIRST LEGO League Mountain State Invitational

2017 Fairmont, West Virginia 
The 2017 Mountain State Invitational was held at Faimont State University in Fairmont, West Virginia from July 7–9, 2017.

2019 Fairmont, West Virginia 
The 2019 Mountain State Invitational was held at Faimont State University in Fairmont, West Virginia from July 12–14, 2019.

FIRST LEGO International Open

2008 Minneapolis, Minnesota, USA 
The international open for 2008 was held in Minneapolis, Minnesota from May 1–3, 2008. The event was called HighTechKids First Lego League International Open using the Power Puzzle challenge. Teams event had the standard judging and performance aspects as well as a head-to-head competition and an alliance challenge. For the alliance challenge teams were assigned to an alliance made up of 4 teams at the beginning of the tournament.

2019 Byblos, Lebanon 
The 2019 FIRST LEGO League Open International was the first international open championship held in the Arab World, co-organized by the Education and Technology Center, FIRST LEGO League operational partners in Lebanon, and the Lebanese American University - LAU in Byblos between June 14 and June 16, 2019 under the patronage of the president of the council of ministers Mr. Saad Hariri.

The event joined 72 teams from 35 countries from 5 continents, with 684 participating team members, and over 1000 attendees on the 3 days of the event.

References

External links
 2009 FIRST LEGO League Open European Championship
 2009 FIRST LEGO League United States Open Championship
 2010 FIRST LEGO League Open International Championship
 FIRST
 2014 Canadian Open

For Inspiration and Recognition of Science and Technology
Student robotics competitions